Anthony Charles Wise (born December 28, 1951) was an American football coach. He won one Super Bowl with the Dallas Cowboys of the National Football League (NFL) and one national championship at the University of Miami. He played college football at Ithaca College.

Early years
Wise attended Shaker High School, where he practiced football, lacrosse and ice hockey. He accepted a football scholarship from Ithaca College to play as an offensive lineman. He also lettered in lacrosse and ice hockey.

Coaching career
In 1973, he began his football coaching career at Albany State University. He served one-year stints at the University of Bridgeport, Central Connecticut State University and Washington State University before joining the University of Pittsburgh in 1977. He coached at Oklahoma State University from 1979 to 1983 and Syracuse University in 1984. 

He was hired at the University of Miami in 1985. He was a part of the 1987 National Championship team under head coach Jimmy Johnson.

In 1989, he followed head coach Jimmy Johnson and joined the Dallas Cowboys coaching staff as the offensive line coach. He contributed to the team winning Super Bowl XXVII, while developing multiple Pro Bowl players like: Kevin Gogan, Nate Newton, Mark Tuinei, Erik Williams and Mark Stepnoski.

In 1993, he was named the offensive line coach for the Chicago Bears, following former Cowboys defensive coordinator and new Bears head coach Dave Wannstedt. In 1999, he wasn't retained after Dick Jauron replaced Wannstedt as the new Bears head coach. 

In 1999, he was hired as the offensive line coach by the Carolina Panthers, contributing to the team averaging 4.3 yards per rush attempt to rank fifth in the NFL. He resigned on December 27, 2000.

In 2001, he joined the Miami Dolphins as their offensive line coach. He spent four seasons with the team and his offensive lines helped produce at the time the two highest individual single-season rushing totals in club history.

In 2006, he signed to be the offensive line coach with the New York Jets.

References

1951 births
People from Albany County, New York
Players of American football from New York (state)
Ithaca Bombers football players
Washington State Cougars football coaches
Pittsburgh Panthers football coaches
Oklahoma State Cowboys football coaches
Syracuse Orange football coaches
Miami Hurricanes football coaches
Dallas Cowboys coaches
Chicago Bears coaches
Carolina Panthers coaches
Miami Dolphins coaches
New York Jets coaches
Living people